Adam E. Mitchell (born 1908) was a Scottish professional footballer who played as a right half.

Career
Born in Prestonpans, Mitchell played for Penicuik Athletic, Heart of Midlothian, Cowdenbeath, Bo'ness, Bradford City, Wrexham, Doncaster Rovers, Coxhoe Albion and Peterborough United.

For Bradford City, he made 143 appearances in the Football League; he also made 13 FA Cup appearances.

Sources

References

1908 births
Year of death missing
Scottish footballers
Penicuik Athletic F.C. players
Heart of Midlothian F.C. players
Cowdenbeath F.C. players
Bo'ness F.C. players
Bradford City A.F.C. players
Wrexham A.F.C. players
Doncaster Rovers F.C. players
Peterborough United F.C. players
English Football League players
Association football wing halves